Navajoceratops (meaning "Navajo horned face") is a genus of ceratopsid dinosaur from the late Cretaceous Period of what is now North America. The genus contains a single species, N. sullivani, named after Robert M. Sullivan, leader of the expeditions that recovered the holotype.
 

The holotype specimen, SMP VP-1500, collected in 2002, consists of a partial skull. It was discovered in the Campanian Hunter Wash Member of the Kirtland Formation, New Mexico. It was informally named in 2016.

Navajoceratops was a member of the Chasmosaurinae. Alongside fellow chasmosaurine Terminocavus, also from the Kirtland Formation and described in the same paper, Navajoceratops was found to represent a stratigraphic and morphological intermediate between Pentaceratops and Anchiceratops. Navajoceratops was also found to be marginally less derived than Terminocavus.

See also
 Timeline of ceratopsian research

References

Chasmosaurines
Late Cretaceous dinosaurs of North America
Fossil taxa described in 2020
Campanian life
Paleontology in New Mexico
Campanian genus first appearances
Campanian genus extinctions
Ornithischian genera